The Deir ez-Zor suspension bridge was a pedestrian suspension bridge crossing the Euphrates River, in the city of Deir ez-Zor in north-eastern Syria.

The former footbridge connected, across the Euphrates River, the Levant region and the main section of the city on the southern bank, with Upper Mesopotamia region and the eastern section of the city on the northern bank.

History

The iron/steel pedestrian bridge was built in 1927, by the French construction company Fougerolle (then-under Le Soliditit Françs), during the Mandate for Syria and the Lebanon period (1920−1941).

The Deir ez-Zor suspension bridge was destroyed in May 2013, from shelling by Syrian Army forces during the Syrian Civil War.

After the suspension bridge was destroyed, the Siyasiyeh Bridge became the last entry route across the Euphrates to the western section of the city and the adjoining province of Hasakeh. However the locally renamed "bridge of death" was sufficiently dangerous to attacks that only one vehicle could speed across the bridge at a time during night time darkness. It was destroyed in the autumn of 2014, being blown up as a result of the battle between the Islamic State of Iraq and Sham and the Syrian Army.

See also
Deir ez-Zor clashes (2011–14)
Battle of Deir ez-Zor – in 1941, during World War II

References

External links

Bridges in Syria
Bridges over the Euphrates River
Buildings and structures in Deir ez-Zor
Demolished bridges
Footbridges
Steel bridges
Suspension bridges
Bridges completed in 1927
Buildings and structures demolished in 2013
1927 establishments in Mandatory Syria
2013 in the Syrian civil war
Terrorist incidents in Syria in 2013
French colonial architecture